The 2011 Women's European Volleyball League was the third edition of the annual Women's European Volleyball League, which featured Women's national volleyball teams from twelve European countries: Belarus, Bulgaria, Croatia, Czech Republic, France, Greece, Hungary, Israel, Romania, Serbia, Spain, and Turkey. A preliminary league round was played from May 25 to July 10, and the final four tournament, which was held at Istanbul, Turkey, on 15/16 July.

During the league round, competing nations were drawn into two pools of four teams, and played each other in a double round-robin system, with two matches per leg in a total of six legs. Pool winners qualified for the final four round, joining the host team. If the final four host team finished first in its league round pool, the best pool runners-up qualified for the final four.

12 teams participated in this year's edition, which was a record field.

Competing nations

Squads

League round

Pool A

|}

Leg 1

|}

Leg 2

|}

Leg 3

|}

Leg 4

|}

Leg 5

|}

Leg 6

|}

Pool B

|}

Leg 1

|}

Leg 2

|}

Leg 3

|}

Leg 4

|}

Leg 5

|}

Leg 6

|}

Pool C

|}

Leg 1

|}

Leg 2

|}

Leg 3

|}

Leg 4

|}

Leg 5

|}

Leg 6

|}

Final four
The final four will be held at Istanbul, Turkey on July 15/16, 2011.

Qualified teams

 (host)

Semifinals

|}

Bronze medal match

|}

Final

|}

Final standing

Awards
MVP:  Jovana Brakočević
Best Scorer:  Helena Havelková
Best Spiker:  Jovana Brakočević
Best Server:  Eda Erdem 
Best Setter:  Maja Ognjenović
Best Libero:  Gizem Güreşen
Best Receiver:  Šárka Barborková

References

External links
 Confédération Européenne de Volleyball (CEV) – official website

European Volleyball League
European Volleyball League
Women's European Volleyball League
League 2011
Sport in Istanbul